Dean is a city in Clay County, Texas, United States. It is part of the Wichita Falls, Texas Metropolitan Statistical Area. The population was 493 at the 2010 census.

Geography

Dean is located in northwestern Clay County at  (33.928071, –98.379255). Texas State Highway 79 passes through the community, leading southwest  to Wichita Falls and northeast  to Petrolia.

Demographics

As of the census of 2000, there were 341 people, 131 households, and 105 families residing in the city. The population density was 159.2 people per square mile (61.5/km2). There were 136 housing units at an average density of 63.5/sq mi (24.5/km2). The racial makeup of the city was 95.60% White, 0.88% African American, 0.29% Native American, 2.05% from other races, and 1.17% from two or more races. Hispanic or Latino of any race were 5.28% of the population.

There were 131 households, out of which 31.3% had children under the age of 18 living with them, 65.6% were married couples living together, 10.7% had a female householder with no partner present, and 19.8% were non-families. 17.6% of all households were made up of individuals, and 9.2% had someone living alone who was 65 years of age or older. The average household size was 2.60 and the average family size was 2.90.

In the city, the population was spread out, with 25.5% under the age of 18, 5.6% from 18 to 24, 30.2% from 25 to 44, 25.5% from 45 to 64, and 13.2% who were 65 years of age or older. The median age was 39 years. For every 100 females, there were 94.9 males. For every 100 females age 18 and over, there were 91.0 males.

The median income for a household in the city was $45,568, and the median income for a family was $47,813. Males had a median income of $36,875 versus $19,844 for females. The per capita income for the city was $16,521. About 8.2% of families and 7.8% of the population were below the poverty line, including 1.8% of those under age 18 and 9.7% of those age 65 or over.

Education
Dean is served by the Petrolia Independent School District, including Petrolia High School.

References

Cities in Texas
Cities in Clay County, Texas
Wichita Falls metropolitan area